The Grand Prix Velo Alanya is a cycling race held in Turkey. It is part of UCI Europe Tour in category 1.2.

Winners

References

Cycle races in Turkey
2019 establishments in Turkey
Recurring sporting events established in 2019
UCI Europe Tour races